Starigrad ("Old Town") may refer to:

 Starigrad, Zadar County, a village and municipality near Zadar, Croatia
 Starigrad, Lika-Senj County, a village near Senj, Croatia
 Starigrad, Koprivnica-Križevci County, a village near Koprivnica, Croatia
 Starigrad Fortress, a fortress near Omiš, Croatia
 Stari Grad, Croatia, a town on the northern side of the island of Hvar in Dalmatia, Croatia

See also
 Stalingrad (disambiguation)
 Stari grad (disambiguation)
 Novigrad (disambiguation)
 Grad (toponymy)